Uganda, officially the Republic of Uganda, is a landlocked country in East Africa. Uganda's economy generates income from annual exports that include coffee ($466.6 million), tea ($72.1 million), and fish ($136.2 million). The country has commenced economic reforms and growth has been robust. In 2008, Uganda recorded 7% growth despite the global downturn and regional instability.

Uganda has substantial natural resources, including fertile soils, regular rainfall, and sizable mineral deposits of copper and cobalt. The country has largely untapped reserves of both crude oil and natural gas. While agriculture accounted for 56% of the economy in 1986, with coffee as its main export, it has now been surpassed by the services sector, which accounted for 52% of GDP in 2007.

Notable firms 
This list includes notable companies with primary headquarters located in the country. The industry and sector follow the Industry Classification Benchmark taxonomy. Organizations which have ceased operations are included and noted as defunct.

See also

 Banking in Uganda
 Economy of Uganda
 List of airlines of Uganda
 List of banks in Uganda
 List of defunct airlines of Uganda
 List of mobile network operators in Uganda
 List of satellite television service providers in Uganda
 List of sugar manufacturers in Uganda
 Uganda Investment Authority

References

 
Uganda